Hill Cemetery is a historic cemetery on Cousins Island in Yarmouth, Maine. Located in today's Katherine Tinker Preserve, it is now closed to burials.

The cemetery is so named because it contains only members of the Hill family, with dates of death ranging from 1831 to 1899. It includes burials of Revolutionary War veterans.

References

1831 establishments in Maine
Cemeteries in Yarmouth, Maine
Protected areas of Cumberland County, Maine
Cemeteries established in the 1830s